Eric Charles 'Ben' McKay (29 December 1918, in Cambridge, Tasmania – 11 July 1976, in Hobart) was an independent member of the Tasmanian Legislative Council from 9 May 1959 until his death in the Electoral division of Pembroke.

In the following by election he was succeeded by his son Peter McKay.

References

Members of the Tasmanian Legislative Council
1918 births
1976 deaths
20th-century Australian politicians